Eusebius A. Stephanou (June 15, 1924 - May 23, 2016) was a priest of the Greek Orthodox Archdiocese of America and one of the main leaders in the "Orthodox Renewal and Evangelism" movement.  

He was born in Fond du Lac, Wisconsin to Fr. Alexander and Marika Papastephanou. Baptized with the name Agamemnon, Stephanou lived as a child in Detroit, Michigan and Lorain, Ohio where his father served as priest in the local Greek Orthodox Church. In 1942, Stephanou entered Holy Cross Greek Orthodox Seminary, then located in Pomfret Center, Connecticut. Holy Cross relocated to Brookline, Massachusetts in 1946, Stephanou's senior year. In 1950 he was tonsured a monk in Cleveland, Ohio receiving the name Eusebius. At this time he also shortened his name from "Papastephanou" to Stephanou. On September 17, 1950 Stephanou was ordained a Deacon at St. Constantine & Helen Greek Orthodox Church in Detroit. In 1951, he travelled to Greece to study at the University of Athens.  On February 10, 1953 Stephanou was ordained to the holy Priesthood in his father's hometown of Philiatra.

Fr. Eusebius died on May 23, 2016.

References

1924 births
2016 deaths
American Eastern Orthodox priests
Eastern Orthodox priests in the United States
20th-century Eastern Orthodox priests
21st-century Eastern Orthodox priests
20th-century American clergy
21st-century American clergy